

Wigmund was a medieval Archbishop of York, who was consecrated in 837 and died in 854.

Coinage 

During the ninth century, both kings of Northumbria and archbishops of York minted styca coinage. Historian Stewart Lyon estimated that Wigmund produced coinage from between 837 to 846. The coins issued by Wigmund were minted by a number of moneyers, including Aethelweard, Hunlaf and Coenred. Unique and separate from the copper-alloy, mass-produced stycas, is a gold solidus, produced by Wigmund potentially as an ecclesiastical gift.

Citations

References

External links
 

854 deaths
Archbishops of York
9th-century archbishops
Year of birth unknown